Dunnellon is a city  with the unique feature of sitting in 3 counties in Marion, Levy & Citrus counties in Florida, United States.  The predominant part falls in the Marion county.  The population was 1,928 at the 2020 census, up from 1,733 in 2010. It is part of the Ocala Metropolitan Statistical Area.

Geography
Dunnellon is located in southwestern Marion County at 29°3'N 82°27'W (29.0500, –82.4555),  due north of Tampa. It is bordered to the southwest by the Withlacoochee River, which forms the border with Citrus County. Dunnellon is bordered to the north by unincorporated Rainbow Springs.

U.S. Route 41 passes through the city, leading north  to Williston and south  to Inverness.

The Rainbow River joins the Withlacoochee River in Dunnellon, with the combined flow leading west toward the Gulf of Mexico.

Demographics

As of the census of 2000, there were 1,898 people, 950 households, and 555 families residing in the city. The population density was 269.3 inhabitants per square mile (103.9/km2). The racial makeup of the city was 85.72% White, 11.85% African American, 0.11% Native American, 0.53% Asian, 0.05% Pacific Islander, 0.47% from other races, and 1.26% from two or more races. Hispanic or Latino of any race were 1.79% of the population.

There were 950 households, out of which 18.5% had children under the age of 18 living with them, 44.6% were married couples living together, 11.4% had a female householder with no husband present, and 41.5% were non-families. 37.3% of all households were made up of individuals, and 24.4% had someone living alone who was 65 years of age or older. The average household size was 2.00 and the average family size was 2.59.

In the city, the population was spread out, with 17.2% under the age of 18, 5.1% from 18 to 24, 17.7% from 25 to 44, 24.6% from 45 to 64, and 35.5% who were 65 years of age or older. The median age was 53 years. For every 100 females, there were 80.9 males. For every 100 females age 18 and over, there were 75.8 males.

The median income for a household in the city was $27,386, and the median income for a family was $35,313. Males had a median income of $29,605 versus $22,045 for females. The per capita income for the city was $17,905. About 10.4% of families and 15.5% of the population were below the poverty line, including 26.7% of those under age 18 and 11.3% of those age 65 or over.

History

Dunnellon was founded in 1887, two years before the 1899 discovery of phosphate in the area. The subsequent mining boom, the first of its kind in Florida, lasted until the early 1910s. The original mining took place in and around the Rainbow River (then called Blue Run,) using the river's natural flow to transport phosphates. One of the original mining pits is now called the 'Blue Cove' subdivision. Phosphate industry operations began to shift south to the Polk County area, and by the 1960s, Dunnellon's last mine closed. Dunnellon survived the bust period, unlike other nearby phosphate towns including Romeo, LeRoy, Brewster, and Parkersburg.

Areas in and around Dunnellon served as filming locations for the 2001 horror film Jeepers Creepers, with a great deal of location work on Tiger Trail (a.k.a. High School Road), the road to Dunnellon High School, officially known as SW 180th Avenue Rd., just outside Rainbow Springs State Park.

Transportation

Major roads

 The main road through Dunnellon is US 41 a major south-to-north highway that runs from Miami to the Upper Peninsula of Michigan.
County roads include County Roads 40, 336, and 484, all three of which run along Pennsylvania Avenue.
 County Road 40 is a bi-county road that begins along the Gulf of Mexico in Yankeetown in Levy County, and merges with CR 336 before entering the city limits and turning north onto US 41 as hidden State Road 40 where it branches off on its own in Rainbow Lakes Estates north of the city.
 County Road 336 is another bi-county road, but this one spans southeast from western Levy County, and merges with CR 40 west of the city limits before terminating at US 41, where CR 40 turns north and Pennsylvania Avenue becomes CR 484.
 County Road 484, is a major county road in southern Marion County which begins at the terminus of CR 336 and its multiplex with CR 40. It leads to Marion Oaks, and spans as far east as US 27-441 in Summerfield.

Other transportation
Dunnellon had four railroad lines in the past: two owned by the Atlantic Coast Line Railroad, one owned by the Seaboard Air Line Railroad and one owned by the Florida Northern Railroad. A boat launching area exists along the Withlacoochee River. Just outside the city, the Dunnellon/Marion County Airport can be found along CR 484.

Notable people
 Terrence Brooks, football safety for the New York Jets
 Max Lanier, baseball player
 Lerentee McCray, outside linebacker/defensive end for the Denver Broncos
 Kelly Meggs, leader of the Florida Chapter of the Oath Keepers militia, convicted of seditious conspiracy for his role in the January 6, 2021, insurrection at the U.S. Capitol
 Ernie Mills, pro football player, Pittsburgh Steelers
 Russell Quick, hometown hero and actor in Bigger than Life
 Terry Plumeri, classical composer, orchestra conductor, double bassist, lecturer, teacher, producer, and film score composer
 Michael Roof, actor from the XXX films, The Dukes of Hazzard movie, Black Hawk Down and Raising the Roofs

See also
 Dunnellon Boomtown Historic District

References

External links

 
 Ocala/Marion Visitors' & Convention Bureau

Cities in Marion County, Florida
Populated places established in 1887
Cities in Florida
1887 establishments in Florida